Oscar J. Woehrlin (December 12, 1871 - March 7, 1934) was a professional baseball player. He appeared in one game in Major League Baseball in 1895 for the Washington Senators as a shortstop.

He was initially identified as Joe Woerlin until research in 2016 gave Joe's playing record to Oscar.

Woehrlin died in 1934 in his home town of St. Louis, Missouri of prostate cancer.

References

External links

Major League Baseball infielders
Washington Senators (1891–1899) players
19th-century baseball players
1871 births
1934 deaths